The 1830–31 United States Senate elections were held on various dates in various states. As these U.S. Senate elections were prior to the ratification of the Seventeenth Amendment in 1913, senators were chosen by state legislatures. Senators were elected over a wide range of time throughout 1830 and 1831, and a seat may have been filled months late or remained vacant due to legislative deadlock. In these elections, terms were up for the senators in Class 3.

The Jacksonians gained one seat from the Anti-Jacksonian coalition, but lose one seat to the short-lived Nullifier Party.  By the time Congress first met in December 1831, however, the Jacksonians had a net loss of one seat.

Results summary 
Senate party division, 22nd Congress (1831–1833)

 Majority party: Jacksonian (24–23)
 Minority party: Anti-Jackson (21–23)
 Other parties: Nullifier (2–1)
 Total seats: 48

Change in composition

Before the elections 
After the January 7, 1830 special election in Delaware.

As a result of the elections

At the beginning of the first session, December 5, 1831

Race summaries 
Bold states link to specific election articles.

Special elections during the 21st Congress 
In these special elections, the winners were seated during 1830 or before March 4, 1831; ordered by election date.

Races leading to the 22nd Congress 

In these regular elections, the winner was seated on March 4, 1831 (except where noted due to late election); ordered by state.

All of the elections involved the Class 3 seats.

Elections during the 22nd Congress 
In these special elections, the winners were seated in 1831 after March 4; ordered by election date.

Alabama

Connecticut

Delaware (special)

Georgia

Illinois 

Illinois had two elections in this cycle: one for each seat.

Illinois (regular) 

For the Class 3 seat, one-term incumbent Jacksonian Elias Kane was re-elected in 1831 for the term beginning March 4, 1831.

Illinois (special) 

For the Class 2 seat, Jacksonian incumbent John McLean, who had been elected in 1828 or 1829, died October 14, 1830.  Jacksonian David J. Baker was appointed November 12, 1830 to continue the term until a special election.  On December 11, 1830, Jacksonian John McCracken Robinson was elected to finish the term and was seated January 4, 1831.

Indiana

Kentucky 
Kentucky had two elections in this cycle.

When Jacksonian John Rowan's term ended March 3, 1831, the legislature had not yet voted a replacement.  When the legislature resumed for its session in November 1831, Anti-Jacksonian Henry Clay was elected, but still in time to participate when the 22nd Congress convened in December 1831.

Kentucky (regular)

Kentucky (special)

Louisiana 
Louisiana had two elections in this cycle.

Louisiana (regular)

Louisiana (special)

Maryland 

Ezekiel F. Chambers won election over non-voters by a margin of 45.21%, or 33 votes, for the Class 3 seat.

Mississippi (special)

Missouri

New Hampshire

New York 

The Senate election in New York was held on February 1, 1831, by the New York State Legislature. Nathan Sanford had been elected in 1826 to this seat, and his term would expire on March 3, 1831. At the state election in November 1830, the Jacksonians managed to defeat the combined Anti-Masons and Anti-Jacksonians. Enos T. Throop was narrowly re-elected Governor, a large Jacksonian majority was elected to the Assembly, and five of the nine State Senators elected were Jacksonian Democrats. The 54th New York State Legislature met from January 4 to April 26, 1831, at Albany, New York. The Jacksonian State legislators held a caucus before the election, and n The Jacksonian State legislators held a caucus before the electionominated New York Supreme Court Justice William L. Marcy. The vote was 77 for Marcy, 15 for Erastus Root, 6 for the incumbent Nathan Sanford and 6 scattering votes. William L. Marcy was the choice of both the Assembly and the Senate, and was declared elected.

North Carolina

Ohio

The two houses of the Ohio General Assembly met during the winter of 1830-1831 in joint assembly to elect a Senator (Class 3). After seven ballots, on various dates, Thomas Ewing was elected on a majority of the ballots. The balloting was as follows:

Pennsylvania 
Pennsylvania had two election in this cycle.

Pennsylvania (regular) 
-

Pennsylvania (special) 

Following the December 6, 1831 resignation of Senator Isaac Barnard due to ill health, the Pennsylvania General Assembly convened on December 13, 1831, to elect a new Senator to fill the vacancy. Eleven ballots were recorded. The results of the eleventh and final ballot of both houses combined are as follows:

 | -
 ! colspan=3 align=right | Totals
 ! align=right | 133
 ! align=right | 100.00%
|}

Vermont

See also 
 1830 United States elections
 1830–31 United States House of Representatives elections
 21st United States Congress
 22nd United States Congress

Notes

References

Sources 
 Party Division in the Senate, 1789-Present, via Senate.gov